Langtree School is a coeducational secondary school located in the village of Woodcote in South Oxfordshire, England. It became a DfES Specialist Performing Arts College in 2006.

Previously a community school administered by Oxfordshire County Council, in April 2012 Langtree School converted to academy status.

The school was inspected by Ofsted in 2016, and was graded good.

Notable former pupils

 Mark Burton, television and radio comedy writer

References

External links
 Langtree School website

Educational institutions established in 1900
1900 establishments in England
Secondary schools in Oxfordshire
Academies in Oxfordshire